WSIQ is an AM radio station licensed to Salem, Illinois and broadcasting on the frequency of 1350 kHz.  The format for WSIQ is Country music and is known as Q 92.1.

Previous call letters were WJBD (AM) and are still used for the FM station.

FM Translator
WSIQ can also be heard at 92.1 MHz. W221DU is owned by Cedar Rapids, Iowa-based NRG Media.

References

External links 

Radio Locator Information on W221DU

Country radio stations in the United States
SIQ
Marion County, Illinois